The Pyramid Eagle 20 is a family weekend/daysailer trimaran sailboat from the early 1980s. It can be fitted with an outboard motor and sits 4-6 adults. Its outer hulls can be retracted to reduce beam.

See also
 List of multihulls

References

Trimarans